John Hamilton, 1st Marquess of Hamilton (1540–1604) was the founder of the long line of the marquesses and dukes of Hamilton in Scotland.

Birth and origins 
John was born about 1540 in Scotland. He was the third son of James Hamilton and his wife Margaret Douglas. His father was the 2nd Earl of Arran and Duke of Châtellerault in France.

John's mother was a daughter of James Douglas, 3rd Earl of Morton. Both parents were Scottish. They had married in September 1532. John was one of nine siblings, who are listed in his father's article.

Early life 
On 28 November 1547, John, still a boy, was appointed Commendator of Inchaffray Abbey, a position he held until 1551, when he was made Commendator of Arbroath instead. He had the benefit of Arbroath until 1579, although his right was disputed by George Douglas (a natural son of the Earl of Angus who would later become Bishop of Moray).

His family supported Mary, Queen of Scots, even after her imprisonment at Lochleven Castle, her abdication in favour of her one-year-old son on 24 July 1567, her defeat at Langside in 1568 and her flight to England shortly afterwards. In 1570 Moray, who was regent during part of the minority of King VI, was assassinated by John Hamilton of Bothwellhaugh, a supporter of Queen Mary, at Linlithgow. John's father (the Duke of Châtellerault and 2nd Earl of Arran) had been imprisoned by Murray at the time and John himself might have had a hand in the murder. His successor, Regent Lennox, died in 1571 from a shot in his back during a skirmish at Stirling with the Queen's party. Finally, on 23 February 1573, his father gave up his support for Mary and recognised Mary's infant son James as King of Scotland.

Head of the family 
His father died at Hamilton on 22 January 1575. His older brother James succeeded as the 3rd Earl of Arran, but because of his insanity, he was placed under John's care making John the de facto Earl and head of the family.

Marriage and children 
On 30 December 1577 John contracted to marry Margaret Lyon, Countess of Cassilis, the widow of Gilbert Kennedy, 4th Earl of Cassilis, and daughter of John Lyon, 7th Lord Glamis, promising to marry her before 10 February 1578. His wife was a staunch Protestant. She had converted her first husband who had been a Catholic before their marriage.

 
John and Margaret had three children:
Edward, who died in infancy
James (1589–1625), The ambassador William Ashby was a godparent at his christening. He succeeded as the 2nd Marquess of Hamilton
Margaret, who married John Maxwell, 9th Lord Maxwell There were great preparations at Hamilton Palace and rich apparel bought in Edinburgh for the wedding in September 1597.

Hamilton also had two illegitimate children:
Margaret Hamilton, who married Sir Humphrey Colquhoun of Luss
Sir John Hamilton of Letterick, from whom descended the Lords Bargany

Forfeiture and English Exile 
In 1579 James Douglas, 4th Earl of Morton accused John and his younger brother Claud to have been implicated in the murders of the regents Moray and Lennox and obtained that John and Claud were included in the Scottish Act of forfeiture of 1579. In consequence John lost his income from the abbey of Arbroath and had to leave the country. He fled first to England, then to France. He returned to England and there stayed with his brother Claud in the North. While in England he reconciled himself with Archibald Douglas, 8th Earl of Angus who was also in exile there due to his association with the Raid of Ruthven. King James had by now come under the influence of James Stewart of Bothwellmuir, to whom the King had granted Hamilton's brother's earldom of Arran.

Back in Scotland 
John, with Angus, the Earl of Mar, and the Master of Glamis and with the connivance of Elizabeth I of England, raised an army and entered Scotland, reaching Stirling in October 1585. James Stewart of Bothwellmuir fled and King James capitulated on 4 November, receiving the banished lords into his presence.

At a parliament convened at Linlithgow on 1 December 1585, King James rescinded Hamilton's forfeiture and restored him and the other lords to their previously held lands. Further Hamilton was raised to the Privy Council and made captain of Dumbarton Castle. According to David Hume of Godscroft, the Earl of Angus and Hamilton argued over precedence in the king's privy or outer chamber at Holyrood Palace. James VI came out of his bed chamber and made them reconcile by drinking and joining hands.

James VI sailed to Norway in October 1589 and made Hamilton in charge of the three border wards of Scotland. Elizabeth approved of his appointment. In April 1590 he visited Dalkeith Palace and when the gardener tried to stop him taking a horse, Hamilton's servant shot him. On 1 July 1592 Lord John Hamilton captured Archibald Wauchope of Niddrie with other rebel followers of the Earl of Bothwell at the meadow of Lesmahagow and imprisoned them in Craignethan Castle, promising their lives would be spared. James VI sent Sir John Carmichael, captain of the royal guard, to collect the prisoners, but one of Hamilton's sons released them.

In 1588 John founded a grammar school that became known as Hamilton Academy. In 1972 this school became the Hamilton Grammar School.

Marquess 
Hamilton continued to rise in the King's favour, and on 15 April 1599, following the baptism of Princess Margaret at Holyroodhouse, he was created Marquess of Hamilton, Earl of Arran and Lord Aven. In August 1602 he hosted the French ambassador, the Baron de Tour at Hamilton Palace, who hunted with the king and the Duke of Lennox and played a card game called "mawe".

Death, succession, and timeline 
The Marquess died before his elder brother James in April 1604. He was immediately succeeded by his son James as the 2nd Marquess of Hamilton. James also succeeded as the 4th Earl of Arran in 1609 upon his elder brother's death.

Notes and references

Notes

Citations

Sources 

  – G to K (for Hamilton)
  – Ab-Adam to Basing (for Arran)
  – Scotland and Ireland
  
 
 
  – (for timeline)
  (for his wife's first husband)
  
  
 
 
  – Fife to Hyndford (for Hamilton)

1530s births
1604 deaths
16th-century Scottish peers
17th-century Scottish peers
John
John
Peers of Scotland created by James VI